Suzy Paterson is an actress best known for playing Susan Barlow in Coronation Street from 1979 to 1981.

Early life
She was born in June 1961  and started acting lessons at the age of ten. Her first theatre appearance was as a Chinese girl in Aladdin with the Kirkintilloch Players.She then had several parts in BBC plays and appeared in a Max Boyce show.

She has a daughter, Sunny born in 2003.

Coronation Street
When she joined Coronation Street she became the second actress to play Susan Barlow in the soap after Wendy Jane Walker. She appeared with a boyfriend on a cycling holiday and visited old uncle Albert. She returned as a bridesmaid at Ken's wedding to Deirdre. Previously appeared in the STV series The Prime of Miss Jean Brodie with Geraldine McEwan.

References

External links 
 

Place of birth missing (living people)
Living people
British actresses
1961 births